Upper Common Pits is a  geological Site of Special Scientific Interest in the north of Gomshall in Surrey. It is a Geological Conservation Review site.

Overview 
These pits have yielded deposits which are part of the Netley Heath Beds, which date to the Early Pleistocene and are related to the Red Crag Formation. There is a considerable difference in elevation compared with the Red Crag of East Anglia, suggesting differential warping. Near the base there are sandy deposits with many marine fossils.

The site is private land with no public access.

References

Sites of Special Scientific Interest in Surrey
Geological Conservation Review sites